There Was a Crooked Man is a nursery rhyme. The phrase can also refer to:

There Was a Crooked Man (film), 1960 film featuring Norman Wisdom
There Was A Crooked Man (play), a live television drama by Kelly Roos, presented in 1950 on the television anthology Westinghouse Studio One
There Was a Crooked Man..., a 1970 western film starring Kirk Douglas and Henry Fonda
There was a Crooked Man: the Poems of Lex Banning, a collection by Lex Banning

See also
"There Is a Crooked Man", a Jack Wodhams short story.
A depiction of the Crooked Man appears as the main antagonist in The Wolf Among Us.
Another depiction of the Crooked Man plays the role of the titular character and main antagonist in The Crooked Man.
Another depiction of the Crooked Man appears as a demonic antagonist of the 2016 horror film The Conjuring 2.
The Crooked Man, a 2012 indie horror video game.